The Phai are an ethnic group in Thailand and Laos. They are one of two sub-groups of the Lua people (the other one being the Mal).

Name Variation
The Phai are also commonly referred to as Prai, Phay, Thung Chan Pray, Kha Phay, and Pray. In Laos they are also referred to as Htin.

Language
The Phai speak a language also called Phai, which belongs to the Khmuic branch of Austroasiatic languages There are several dialects called Phai, that are sometimes hardly mutually intelligible.

Geographic Distribution
Population in Thailand:  36,000 in Nan Province
Population in Laos:  15,000 in Phongsali and Xaignabouli Provinces

References

Ethnic groups in Laos
Ethnic groups in Thailand
Khmuic peoples